Still Reportin'... is the fourth solo studio album by the hip hop artist Tragedy Khadafi.

Track listing

Bonus tracks

Chart positions

Album

Samples
Hood Love
"You Are My Joy (Interlude)" by Faith Evans
Still Reportin
"All in Love Is Fair" by Stevie Wonder
Wake the Dead (Black Aura Skit)
"People Make the World Go Round" by The Stylistics
Eloheem
"Before The Beginning" by Fleetwood Mac

References

2003 albums
Tragedy Khadafi albums
Albums produced by Scram Jones